West Lingnan Circuit (Chinese: t , s , p Lǐngnánxīdào) was a circuit of China during the Tang dynasty.

See also
 Lingnan Circuit
 Tang dynasty
 History of the administrative divisions of China

Tang dynasty